Cape Recife ("Cape of the reefs") is the southeastern tip of Africa, 15 kilometres south of the South African seaport city Port Elizabeth. Cape Recife is the southern point of Algoa Bay and forms part of the Nelson Mandela Bay Metropolitan Municipality.

The name, Portuguese for “Rif”, refers to the numerous reefs on which many ships stranded. The historic lighthouse was built in 1849 and is located in the Cape Recife nature reserve. Just north are the Nelson Mandela University, Port Elizabeth International Airport and SANCCOB.

Cape Recife is popular with surfers and divers. The warm Agulhas Current flows past the cape.

In 1973 the  Cape Recife Nature Reserve was proclaimed.

Gallery

References

External links 

 Cape Recife

Landforms of the Eastern Cape
Maritime history of South Africa